Tivadar Millner (7 March 1899 – 28 October 1988)

was a Hungarian chemical engineer, educator, and inventor who developed tungsten lamps.

Working at Tungsram, Tivadar Millner, along with Pál Túry,
co-developed large-crystal tungsten technology for the production of more reliable and longer-lasting coiled filament lamps.

In 1923 at Tungsram Ltd., a research laboratory was established for improving light sources, mainly electric bulbs.
The head of that laboratory was Ignácz Pfeiffer (1867-1941), whose research staff included Tivadar Millner, along with Zoltán Bay (1900-1992), Imre Bródy (1891-1944), György Szigeti (1905-1978), and Ernő Winter (1897-1971).

Notes 

Crew rocks

External links
 KFKI notes on Tivadar Millner.

20th-century Hungarian inventors
20th-century Hungarian engineers
1899 births
1988 deaths